Zainal Abidin, more commonly known by his title, Sutan Kumala Pontas, was a former governor of North Sumatra.

He became acting governor after the previous governor, Sutan Mohammad Amin Nasution, resigned. 

He was inaugurated as a governor on 25 January 1957.

References 

Governors of North Sumatra
Possibly living people
Year of birth missing (living people)